Titus van Rijn (22 September 1641 – 4 September 1668) was the fourth and only surviving child of Rembrandt Harmenszoon van Rijn and Saskia van Uylenburgh.  Titus is best known as a figure or model in his father's paintings and studies but also because of a legal case as preferential heir.

Life
Titus van Rijn was born in Amsterdam on September 22, 1641, the fourth child of the famed artist Rembrandt van Rijn and his wife Saskia van Uylenburgh. When she died Titus and Rembrandt were her only heirs, until Rembrandt would remarry or Titus or all his children would die before his father. He grew up at Jodenbreestraat, for years named Rembrandthuis. Titus was the largest and preferential creditor of Rembrandt, meaning that, if Rembrandt went insolvent, the will would have made Titus became the first person to be paid off, before any other creditors could step in. At age 14, in a year of plague, Titus made a will at his father's insistence, making his father sole heir, shutting out his mother’s family. One year later his half-sister Cornelia (1654-1684) became his only heir. After Rembrandt's bankruptcy in 1656, and the sale of the house in 1658, the family moved to a cheaper house at Rozengracht in the Jordaan. Titus and Rembrandt's longtime lover, Hendrickje Stoffels, were named in charge of Rembrandt's affairs and began in 1660 an art dealership, specializing in Rembrandt's work. The authorities and his creditors were generally accommodating to him but Rembrandt could not sell anything without their knowledge. To get around this, Hendrickje and Titus set up a dummy corporation as art dealers in 1660, with Rembrandt as an employee. In 1662 one of Rembrandt's creditors went to the High Court (Hof van Holland) as didn't accept Titus had to be paid first. Isaac van Hertsbeeck lost twice and had to pay the money he had already received to Titus, which he did in 1668. Titus died on 4 September 1668 during a bubonic plague epidemic in Amsterdam and was buried three days later on 7 September 1668.

Marriage

In February 1668, Titus married Magdalena van Loo (1641-1669). The couple lived at Magdalena's mother's house on the Singel. Her husband was Jan van Loo, silversmith, whose brother was Gerrit van Loo, a lawyer in Het Bildt. He owned quite a few paintings by Adriaen Brouwer. Titus van Rijn died on 4 September and was buried in the Westerkerk. His father, wife, and mother-in-law were all buried a year later. The couple had one daughter, Titia (1669-1715), who married François van Bijler in 1686, the son of her guardian.

References

External links 

Amsterdam City Archive

1641 births
1668 deaths
Businesspeople from Amsterdam
Dutch art dealers
Articles containing video clips
Family of Rembrandt